Seven Days of Sin is a 2012 Czech action historical drama film directed by Jiří Chlumský.

Synopsis
Based on a true story set in the Sudetenland, an area of Czechoslovakia occupied by Nazi Germany, in the spring of 1945, the film begins with the wedding of forester Jan Olšan and his beloved Agnes. Their union is problematic due to the fact that Jan is Czech, and Agnes is German. Agnes's father and brother Jürgen both oppose the marriage, as they feel that by marrying a Czech, Agnes will dilute their pure German blood. As the war comes to an end and the area is liberated, Agnes is persecuted by the Czechs and goes missing. Jan and Jürgen go in search of her, and the former is eventually accused of collaborating with the Nazis.

Cast and characters
 Ondřej Vetchý as Jan Olšan
 Jarek Hylebrant as Jürgen Schreier
 Vica Kerekes as Agnes
 Jiří Schmitzer as Ditrich
 Norbert Lichý as Dohnal
 Igor Bareš as Lubomír Přikryl
 Attila Mokos as Brachtl
 Fyodor Bondarchuk as Uvarov
 Kostas Zerdaloglu as Bozděch
 Anna Šišková as Helga
 Katarína Kolajová as Marie
 Karel Hlušička as old Olšan

References

External links
 
 7 dní hříchů at CSFD.cz 
 7 dní hříchů at cfn.cz 

2012 films
Czech historical drama films
Slovak historical drama films
2010s Czech-language films
Czech action films
2012 drama films
Czech World War II films
Czech action war films